The Royal Saudi Air Force Museum (or Saqr Al Jazeera Aviation Museum) is located on the East Ring Road of Riyadh between exits 10 and 11. A Lockheed L-1011 Tristar formerly operated by Saudia serves as a gate guard visible from the ring road.

Overview
The museum presents the history of the Royal Saudi Air Force from its establishment in the 1920s to the present day.

The museum comprises an outdoor static park and a large and modern indoor museum.

Static park
Aircraft on display include:

BAC Lightning T-55
BAC Strikemaster Mk80
Boeing 707 in Saudia livery
Boeing F-15D Eagle
Cessna 310
Douglas A-26B Invader
Douglas DC-4
Lockheed C-130 Hercules
Lockheed L-1011 Tristar in Saudia livery
Lockheed T-33A Shooting Star
Panavia Tornado ADV F3 & IDS
North American T-6 Texan

Display halls
The display halls contain exhibits on the history of the RSAF, aircraft engines and weaponry, uniforms, insignia and decorations and a special display on Prince Sultan bin Salman bin Abdulaziz Al Saud, the first Saudi in space, who served as a payload specialist on the Space Shuttle Discovery during mission STS-51-G.

Aircraft on display include:

BAC Lightning F53
Bell UH-1
Bell OH-58
de Havilland Chipmunk Mk 10
de Havilland Vampire FB Mk 52 
Douglas DC-3 outfitted to represent the aircraft given by President Franklin D. Roosevelt to King Ibn Saud in 1945
Hawker Hunter F Mk60
North American F-86F Sabre
Northrop F-5E Tiger II
North American T-6 Texan
Temco T-35 Buckaroo

See also
 List of aerospace museums
 List of museums in Saudi Arabia
 Museums in Riyadh

References

External links

A quick view over Saqr Al Jazeera Museum on YouTube

1999 establishments in Saudi Arabia
Museums established in 1999
Air force museums
Museums in Riyadh
Royal Saudi Air Force